The 2017–18 Gimnàstic de Tarragona's season is the 131st season in the club's existence and the third consecutive in Segunda División.

Players

Squad

Transfers

In

Total spending:  €0

Out

Total gaining:  €600,000

Balance
Total:  €600,000

Contracts

Managers

Player statistics

Squad statistics 

 

|-
|colspan="10"|Players on loan to other clubs:

|-
|colspan="10"|Players who have left the club after the start of the season:

|}

Top scorers

Disciplinary record

Competitions

Pre-season/Friendlies

Copa Catalunya

Segunda División

Results summary

Results by round

Matches

Copa del Rey

References

External links
Official website 
Match highlights  
Club news in Diari de Tarragona 

 

2017–18 in Catalan football
Spanish football clubs 2017–18 season
Gimnàstic de Tarragona seasons